Tom Cheeseman (born 22 March 1986) is a Welsh rugby union footballer currently playing for Esher. He is a former Wales Under-19 international. In September 2010 Cheeseman joined the Newport Gwent Dragons from Bath on loan until the end of the 2010–11 Magners League. In February 2011 he joined Harlequins before joining Esher in June 2011 on a deal that meant he could continue to train with Harlequins.

His father Trevor Cheeseman is a former England B international Second Row forward who currently teaches Physical Education at Olchfa Comprehensive School in Swansea.

References

External links
Aviva Premiership rugby profile
Newport Gwent Dragons profile

Welsh rugby union players
Bath Rugby players
Dragons RFC players
Harlequin F.C. players
Esher RFC players
1986 births
Living people
Rugby union players from Swansea
Rugby union centres